Corruption in Slovenia is examined on this page.

Extent 
According to Transparency International's Global Corruption Barometer 2013, political parties rank as the most corrupt institution in Slovenia, closely followed by Parliament, the judiciary and public officials. According to the same survey, 77% of the households consider the government's efforts in fighting corruption “ineffective”.

In January 2013, thousands of Slovenians joined the Commission for the Prevention of Corruption and took to the streets, demanding the resignation of Prime Minister Janez Janša and opposition leader Zoran Janković because both had been accused of failing to properly declare their personal assets. The Commission accused both of “systemic, gross and repeated violations of the anti-corruption legislation”. The month after the protest, Janša was ousted in a no-confidence vote. In June 2013, Janša was convicted of corruption in connection with a 2006 defence contract and given a two-year prison sentence. The conviction was unanimously overturned by the Constitutional Court on 23 April 2015. However, Zoran Janković, continued his mandate as mayor of Ljubljana.

Slovenia has been stagnating in the field of corruption for at least 5 years. Major systemic measures are needed to lower the level of corruption in Slovenia.

Areas

Public 
On Transparency International's 2021 Corruption Perceptions Index, Slovenia scored 57 on a scale from 0 ("highly corrupt") to 100 ("highly clean"). When ranked by score, Slovenia ranked 41st among the 180 countries in the Index, where the country ranked first is perceived to have the most honest public sector.  For comparison, the best score was 88 (ranked 1), and the worst score was 11 (ranked 180).

Business 
According to Transparency International's Global Corruption Barometer 2013, the private sector is scored 3.3 on a 5-point scale (1 being 'not at all corrupt' and 5 'extremely corrupt').

According to the World Economic Forum's Global Competitiveness Report 2013-2014, corruption ranks among the top-five most problematic factors for doing business in Slovenia, after access to financing, inefficient government bureaucracy, restrictive labour regulations and tax rates. However, surveyed executives report that public funds are rarely diverted due to corruption, and the ethical behaviour of companies is considered relatively high.

Police

See also 
 International Anti-Corruption Academy
 Group of States Against Corruption
 International Anti-Corruption Day
 ISO 37001 Anti-bribery management systems
 United Nations Convention against Corruption
 OECD Anti-Bribery Convention
 Transparency International

References

External links
Slovenia Corruption Profile from the Business Anti-Corruption Portal

 
Slovania